Red Clay Harvest is an album by Cravin' Melon, released in 1997.

The album was the band's major label debut. Benmont Tench and Tommy Stinson contributed to the album.  "Come Undone" was a minor Billboard Mainstream Rock hit.

Critical reception
Stereo Review wrote: "When you've got good songs, a great lead voice, and solid supporting players, you don't really need attitude, tattoos, and studio tomfoolery." The Encyclopedia of Popular Music called the album "an excellent introduction to the group's relaxed, highly tuneful rock/pop fare."

Track list

Personnel
Jimbo Chapman - guitar
Rob Clay - bass
Doug Jones - vocals
Rick Reames - drums

References

1997 albums
Cravin' Melon albums